Katherine Elizabeth Jones (born 1972) is a British biodiversity scientist, with a special interest in bats.  She is Professor of Ecology and Biodiversity, and Director of the Biodiversity Modelling Research Group, at University College London.  She is a past chair of the Bat Conservation Trust.

Education 
Jones graduated with a Bachelor of Science degree in Zoology from the University of Leeds in 1993 and with a Ph.D. from the University of Surrey in 1998.

Research 
Jones is interested in understanding how biodiversity is maintained and conserved globally. She won a 2008 Philip Leverhulme Award in Zoology (given to "outstanding young scholars … whose future contributions are held to be of correspondingly high promise") and holds a number of scientific advisory board positions for national and international conservation charities.

Jones has researched bats in Transylvania where she developed  new ways of monitoring bat populations through sound.

Jones has been involved in a number of citizen science projects including Bat Detective and a phone related bat monitoring project. According to Google Scholar and Scopus her most cited papers have been published in Science and Nature.

Honours and awards 
Jones was awarded the Philip Leverhulme Prize in 2011. In 2022 she was awarded the Marsh Award for Conservation Biology
by the Zoological Society of London  and the Marsh Ecology Award from the British Ecological Society.

Personal life 
Jones is also known for her love of cocktails, which she discussed with Jim Al-Khalili on the BBC radio programme The Life Scientific.

In a Guardian feature on "Why more women should consider a career in science", Jones said:

References

External links

1972 births
Living people
British mammalogists
British ecologists
Women ecologists
Alumni of the University of Leeds
Alumni of the University of Surrey
Academics of University College London